Incubation Park is a station on Line 1, Line 9 and Line 18 of Chengdu Metro in China.

Station layout

Gallery

References

Railway stations in Sichuan
Railway stations in China opened in 2010
Chengdu Metro stations